União de Marechal Hermes Futebol Clube, commonly known as União de Marechal Hermes, is a Brazilian football club based in Rio de Janeiro, Rio de Janeiro state. The club was formerly known as Sport Club União de Marechal Hermes.

History
The club was founded on November 5, 1915, as Sport Club União de Marechal Hermes, being renamed to União de Marechal Hermes Futebol Clube on May 13, 2000. União is named after the neighborhood they are located in, Marechal Hermes.

Stadium

União de Marechal Hermes Futebol Clube play their home games at Estádio Luso-Brasileiro. The stadium has a maximum capacity of 5,994 people.

References

Association football clubs established in 1915
Football clubs in Rio de Janeiro (state)
1915 establishments in Brazil